R. E. Cooper Sr, M.B.E., (1913–1980) founding pastor of The Mission Baptist Church in Nassau, Bahamas was a leading figure in the country's struggle to achieve Black Majority Rule (1967). Cooper is best known for preaching the Bahamas' first Independence Day sermon when independence was obtained from Great Britain on July 10, 1973.

Early life and education
Reuben Edward Cooper was born in Georgetown, Exuma and, later, was involved in the Salem Union Baptist Church in Nassau before going on to complete his ministerial studies at the American Baptist Theological Seminary (now American Baptist College) in Nashville, Tennessee.

Ministerial career
Upon his return to the Bahamas following the completion of his studies, Dr. Cooper founded the Mission Baptist Church in Grant's Town, an impoverished neighborhood that was originally settled by ex-slaves.  Eventually, Dr. Cooper joined the Progressive Liberal Party (PLP) and became a close friend and colleague of the nation's first prime minister Sir Lynden Pindling.  Through his work as a Baptist minister, Dr. Cooper facilitated the establishment of the Jordan Memorial School and Prince Williams High School, both of which played a significant role in providing education to black Bahamians prior to the establishment of widespread public schooling in The Bahamas. Dr. Cooper also served terms as president of the Bahamas Baptist Missionary and Education Convention and the Bahamas Christian Council and was an active participant in the Caribbean Baptist Fellowship and the Baptist World Alliance.

Notable achievements

1940 – Organized The Mission Baptist Church

1943 – Organized The Jordan Memorial Baptist School

1949 – Editor and Publisher of The Baptist Weekly

1952 – Erected the second sanctuary of The Mission Baptist Church

1964 – President of The Bahamas Missionary & Educational Convention

1964 – Organized the Prince William Baptist High School

1967 – Chaplain of the Senate

1968 – Formed The United Baptist Choir

1968 – Chairman of The Arthur Vinning Davis Scholarship Programme, Florida Memorial College

1971 – President of The Bahamas Christian Council

1972 – Principal of The Baptist Bible Institute

1973 – Preached the First Independence Day Sermon to the New Nation

1974 – Chaplain of Her Majesty's Prisons

1974 – Dedicated the present structure of The Mission Baptist Church

1976 – Moderator of the Bahamas Baptist Association

1976 – Appointed to the Committee of Ecumenism and Church Polity Baptist World Alliance

1977 – Member of the United World College Advisory Board

For further study
Jones, Wendall K., ed. The 100 Most Outstanding Bahamians of the 20th Century. Nassau: Jones Communications, 2000.

1913 births
1980 deaths
Bahamian Baptist ministers
20th-century Baptist ministers
People from Exuma
People from Nassau, Bahamas
Colony of the Bahamas people
Members of the Order of the British Empire
Christian clergy in the Bahamas